Thionyl bromide is the chemical compound SOBr2. It is less stable and less widely used than its chloride analogue, thionyl chloride. It is prepared by the action of hydrogen bromide on thionyl chloride, a characteristic reaction where a stronger acid is converted to a weaker acid:

SOCl2  +  2 HBr  →  SOBr2  +  2 HCl

Thionyl bromide will convert alcohols to alkyl bromides and can be used for brominations of certain α,β-unsaturated carbonyl compounds. It may occasionally be used as a solvent.

Safety
SOBr2 hydrolyzes readily in air to release dangerous fumes of sulfur dioxide and hydrogen bromide.

SOBr2  +  H2O  →  SO2  +  2 HBr

References

Sulfur oxohalides
Oxobromides
Thionyl compounds
Sulfur(IV) compounds
Inorganic solvents